This is a list of notable manufacturers of loudspeakers. In regard to notability, this is not intended to be an all-inclusive list; it is a list of manufacturers especially noted for their loudspeakers and which have articles on Wikipedia. To see more manufacturers, please refer to the category Loudspeaker manufacturers.

See also

 Lists of companies
 List of studio monitor manufacturers
 :Category:Audio amplifier manufacturers

References 

Loudspeaker manufacturers